Double Vision is a 1986 album by Bob James and David Sanborn. The album was a successful smooth jazz release receiving frequent airplay. The original album was released in the US on May 19, 1986, Warner Bros, Cat No: 25393. It was released a week later in the UK.

Critical reception

Scott Yanow of AllMusic says, "One of the best recordings ever released under James' name (Sanborn gets co-billing)"

Charts and accolades
The album spent 63 weeks on the Billboard charts, peaking at No. 16 on the R&B albums chart and No. 50 on the Top Pop Albums chart. In 1987, the album won the Grammy Award for Best Jazz Fusion Performance, Vocal or Instrumental and the song "Since I Fell for You" earned a nomination for Al Jarreau in the category Best R&B Vocal Performance, Male.

Track listing

Personnel 
 Bob James – keyboards, synthesizers, programming, rhythm arrangements, synthesizer arrangements
 David Sanborn – saxophone
 Robbie Kilgore – synthesizer programming
 Paul Jackson, Jr. – guitar
 Eric Gale – guitar (4, 7)
 Marcus Miller – bass, rhythm arrangements (1, 2)
 Steve Gadd – drums
 Paulinho da Costa – percussion
 Bob Riley – drum programming (5)
 Al Jarreau – vocal (4)

Production 
 Tommy LiPuma – producer 
 Bill Schnee – engineer, mixing, additional recording 
 Bob James – additional recording
 Andy Cardenas – second engineer
 Gene Curtis – second engineer
 Dan Garcia – second engineer
 Peter Robbins – second engineer
 Doug Sax – mastering at The Mastering Lab (Hollywood, California).
 Larry Fishman – production coordinator 
 Laura LiPuma – art direction, design 
 Eric Blum – cover artwork

Track information and credits verified from the album's liner notes.

Charts

References

External links
Bob James Official Site
David Sanborn Official Site
Warner Records Official Site

1986 albums
Bob James (musician) albums
Warner Records albums
David Sanborn albums
Albums produced by Tommy LiPuma
Grammy Award for Best Jazz Fusion Performance